N VBI-2902 is a COVID-19 vaccine candidate developed by Variation Biotechnologies from the United States.

History 
In early 2020, in collaboration with NRC the VBI's vaccine—VBI-2900—was developed. According to the company, they have two vaccine candidates—"enveloped virus-like particle (eVLP)". VBI-2901 is a "trivalent pan-coronavirus vaccine expressing the SARS-CoV-2, SARS-CoV, and MERS-CoV spike proteins". VBI-2902 is a "monovalent COVID-19-specific vaccine expressing the SARS-CoV-2 spike protein". By March 9, the initial Phase 1/2 study of VBI-2902 was underway. VBI received CA$56 million from the federal government towards the COVID-19 vaccine development.

References

External links 

 https://www.vbivaccines.com/press-releases/vbi-2902-preclinical-and-challenge-study-data/

Clinical trials
Canadian COVID-19 vaccines
Virus-like particle vaccines